Tisiphone, or Tilphousia, was one of the three Erinyes or Furies. Her sisters were Alecto and Megaera. She and her sisters punished crimes of murder: parricide, fratricide and homicide.

In culture

Literature

 In Book VI of Virgil's Aeneid, she is described as the guardian of the gates of Tartarus, "clothed in a blood-wet dress".
 In Book X of the Aeneid, she is described as "pale" and raging "among the warring thousands" during the battle between Mezentius and Aeneas's men.
 In Book IV of Ovid's Metamorphoses, she is described as a denizen of Dis who wears a dripping red robe and who has a serpent coiled around her waist. At the behest of Juno, Tisiphone drives Athamas and Ino mad with the breath of a serpent extracted from her hair and a poison made from froth from the mouth of Cerberus and Echidna's venom.
 Tisiphone has a prominent role in Statius' Thebaid, where she spurs on the war between Polynices and Eteocles at the behest of their father, Oedipus. One of her more gruesome feats in the epic is to drive the hero, Tydeus, to cannibalism. In a bizarrely pastoral scene, Tisiphone first appears in the epic lounging beside the Cocytus river in the underworld, letting her serpent locks lap at the sulfuric waters.
 According to one myth, she fell in love with a mortal, Cithaeron, but was spurned; in her anger she formed a poisonous snake from her hair, which bit and killed him.
 In Book I of Chaucer's Troilus and Criseyde, the narrator calls upon her to help him to write the tragedy properly.
 In Canto IX of Dante's Inferno, she appears with her sisters before the gates of Dis, threatening to unveil the Medusa.
 In Henry Fielding’s Tom Jones (Book I, ch. VIII), Bridget smiles “one of those smiles which might be supposed to have come from the dimpled cheeks of the august Tisiphone.”
 In the David Weber space opera In Fury Born, Tisiphone appears as an ancient Greek spirit who is mind-melded with a super-soldier Alicia Devries, and they (along with a starship AI named Megaera) save the universe from evil pirates.

Ships

  was a fire ship of the Royal Navy launched in 1781 and sold for breaking up in 1816.

Astronomy

 Minor planet 466 Tisiphone is named after her.

Video games
 In 2020's Hades, Tisiphone appears, along with Megaera and Alecto, as one of the three potential Fury boss fights during an escape attempt. She is depicted wearing a mask and can initially only speak the word "murderer", though she eventually learns protagonist Zagreus's name if confronted enough times. In her Codex entry, Achilles describes her as the most frightening of the Furies, and "probably responsible for the particularly fearsome reputation they all share", thanks to "least [sharing] the qualities with which mortals can identify".
 In 2013's God of War: Ascension, Tisiphone appears as one of the secondary antagonist, voiced by Debi Mae West. Tisiphone was one of the Furies and the sister of Alecto and Megaera, and possessed shape-shifting powers.
 In Gods of Olympus, she is portrayed as someone with icy abilities. She wields an icy longsword, similar to her sister, Alecto's, which is fiery.

See also
Family tree of the Greek gods

References

External links
 

Furies/Erinyes
Greek goddesses
Characters in Book VI of the Aeneid
Greek underworld
Underworld goddesses